The Royal Navy Medical Service is the branch of the Royal Navy responsible for medical care. It works closely with Queen Alexandra's Royal Naval Nursing Service.

History
The history of the service can be traced back to 1692 when treatment for sick and wounded naval personnel was administered by the Commissioners of the Sick and Hurt Board (a subsidiary body of the Navy Board) until 1806, when medical officers of the Royal Navy had been under the direction of the Transport Board. In 1817 the Transport Board was combined with the Navy Board, and responsibility for medical officers passed to the Victualling Board. In 1832 the two remaining bodies of the Royal Navy (the Navy Board and the Victualling Board) were abolished following recommendations by the First Lord of the Admiralty, Sir James Graham. Now a new Physician of the Navy, reporting to one of the members of the Board of Admiralty, was put in charge of the navy medical department; the title of this post was changed to Physician-General of the Navy in 1835, then to Inspector-General of Naval Hospitals and Fleets in 1841, and then to Director-General of the Medical Department of the Navy in 1844. In 1879 the offices of the director-general were located at 9 New Street, Spring Gardens, London. In 1917 following further re-structuring within the Admiralty Department it became known as the Royal Navy Medical Service headed by Medical Director General of the Navy until 2002, when it was re-styled once more to Medical Director General (Naval); the MDG Naval currently reports to the Second Sea Lord and Deputy Chief of the Naval Staff.

Current structure
The medical branch today is made up of Medical Officers (physicians) and non-commissioned officers and ratings as medical assistants, who receive similar training to paramedics. Nursing services are provided for the navy by the QARNNS which works alongside the Medical Service, but is a separate organisation.  In total, 1,522 personnel are employed by the service.

It is currently commanded by Surgeon Commodore Fleur Marshall, the Medical Director General (Naval); MDG(N) and Chief Naval Medical Officer.

The honorary Commodore-in-Chief of the RNMS is Queen Camilla. In her role as Commodore-in-Chief, the Duchess visited the training-establishment HMS Excellent in January 2012, to award medals to naval medical teams returning from service in Afghanistan.

All ranks of the medical branch provide medical care afloat as well at naval shore establishments and with the royal marines.

Medical Assistants

Medical Assistants are deployed on all major warships and submarines of the Royal Navy, and provide primary care to the crew. They also have the role of training the crew in first aid. Capital ships often carry non-commissioned medical technicians as part of the larger medical department, who perform laboratory work to aid the medical assistants and officers.

Medical Assistants both male and female provide medical close support and shore side medical care to all Units of 3 Commando Brigade Royal Marines.

All medical assistants are ranked in the same manner as other ratings.

Medical Officers
Capital ships (including aircraft carriers, LPHs) have separate medical departments permanently staffed by one or two medical officers, but they are embarked temporarily on smaller vessels when on a long operational tour. Medical officers are ranked in the same manner as other officers, but wear red stripes between the gold on their epaulettes, and have the title 'Surgeon' added to their rank (Surgeon Lieutenant for example). Although Royal Navy medical officers are qualified doctors, they do not use the Dr prefix, like those in other British military medical organisations.

Administration of the Royal Navy Medical Service

Note: This is an incomplete list.

Physician of the Navy
Sir William Burnett (9 Jun 1832–1835)
Physician-General of the Navy
Sir William Burnett (1835 – 27 January 1841)

Inspector-General of Naval Hospitals and Fleets
Sir William Burnett (28 January 1841 – 31 December 1843)

Director-General of the Medical Department of the Navy
 Sir William Burnett (1 January 1844 – 29 April 1845)
 Sir John Liddell (30 April 1855 – 20 January 1864)
 Dr Alexander Bryson (21 January 1864 – 14 April 1869)
 Sir Alexander Armstrong (15 April 1869 – 31 January 1880)
 Sir John Watt Reid (1 February 1880 – 26 February 1888)
 Surgeon Vice Admiral, Sir James Nicholas Dick (27 February 1888 – 31 March 1898)
 Surgeon Vice Admiral, Sir Henry Frederick Norbury (1 April 1898 – 11 September 1904)
 Surgeon Vice Admiral, Sir Herbert M. Ellis (12 September, 12 September 1904 – 10 May 1908)
 Surgeon Vice Admiral, Sir James Porter (11 May 1908 – 10 May 1913)
 Surgeon Vice Admiral, Sir Arthur W. May (11 May 1913 – 31 May 1917)

Medical Director-General of the Navy
 Surgeon Vice Admiral, Sir William H. Norman (1 June 1917 – 1 June 1919)
 Surgeon Vice Admiral, Sir Robert Hill (1 June 1919 – 1 October 1923)
 Surgeon Vice Admiral, Sir Joseph Chambers (1 October 1923 – 1927)
 Surgeon Vice Admiral, Sir Arthur Gaskell (1927–1931)
 Surgeon Vice Admiral, R. W. B. Hall (2 July 1934 – 2 July 1937)
 Surgeon Vice Admiral, Percival T. Nicholls (2 July 1937 – 1945)
 Surgeon Vice Admiral, Sir C. Edward Greeson (1948–1951)
 Surgeon Vice Admiral, Sir Alexander Ingleby-Mackenzie (1952–1956)
 Surgeon Vice Admiral, Sir R. Cyril May (1956–1959)
 Surgeon Vice Admiral, William Robert Sylvester Panckridge (1959–1966)
 Surgeon Vice Admiral, Eric Dick Caldwell (1966–1968)
 Surgeon Vice Admiral, Eric Blackburn Bradbury (1968–1970)
 Surgeon Vice Admiral, James Watt (1972–1977)
 Surgeon Vice Admiral, John Rawlins (1977–1980)
 Surgeon Vice Admiral, John Harrison (1980–1982)
 Surgeon Rear Admiral, Ian Jenkins (1999–2002)

Medical Director-General (Naval)
 Surgeon Vice Admiral, Sir Philip Raffaelli (2007–2009)
 Surgeon Vice Admiral, Sir John Harrison (2010–2011) 
 Surgeon Rear Admiral, Lionel Jarvis (2011 – April 2012)
 Surgeon-Commodore, Calum J. G McArthur (April 2012 – 2013)
 Surgeon Rear Admiral, Alasdair Walker (2014–2015; promoted to Surgeon Vice-Admiral in 2016)
 Surgeon-Commodore, Peter Buxton (2015–2017)
 Commodore, Inga J. Kennedy (2017–2021)
 Surgeon-Commodore, Fleur T. Marshall (2021–present)

See also
Army Medical Services
RAF Medical Services
 William Job Maillard VC
 Kate Nesbitt MC
 Surgeon Vice Admiral Ian Jenkins
 Surgeon Captain Rick Jolly
 Physician
 Military medicine

References

External links
 Website of the Royal Navy Medical Service
 Ministry of Defence - Royal Navy Medical Services (RNMS)

Medical units and formations of the United Kingdom
Naval units and formations of the United Kingdom
1918 establishments in the United Kingdom